Tomb Raider: Original Motion Picture Soundtrack is the film score to the film of the same name, based on the 2013 video game of the same name by Crystal Dynamics. The music was composed and arranged by Tom Holkenborg. It was released digitally on March 9, 2018, by Sony Classical Records with the physical edition being released on March 16, 2018, followed by the vinyl being released later on August 24, 2018.

Background
On June 14, 2017, Tom Holkenborg was announced as the film's composer for Tomb Raider. He was originally scoring Zack Snyder's Justice League but was replaced by Danny Elfman. Holkenborg commented that "It pains me to leave the project, but a big thanks to Zack for asking me to be part of his vision, and I wish Danny, Joss, and Warner Bros all the best with Justice League."

For the basis of the score, Holkenborg looked to the late Jóhann Jóhannsson's score to Sicario. But the majority of his inspiration came from the film score album, Birdy by Peter Gabriel which served as the foundation for the island scenes in the film. On creating the sound for Tomb Raider, Holkenborg combined a bunch of different animal sounds to create a canvas for the score and then worked on top of that. He then employed an original approach with director Roar Uthaug, with an emphasis on raw sound design and music to portray the journey of Lara, one of which was through the use of strong percussion to give that sense of grittiness and realism.

Scoring took place over two days at AIR Lyndhurst Studios in London, with the London Studio Orchestra conducted by John Ashton Thomas. Aljoscha Christenhuß and Antonio Di Iorio provided additional music.

Track listing

The film also features Run for your Life performed by K.Flay which appears in the end credits of the film.

Personnel
 Score Composer, Producer and Mixer & Synth Programming — Tom Holkenborg
 Additional Music — Aljoscha Christenhuß & Antonio Di Iorio
 Technical Score Engineer — Alex Ruger
 Additional Programming — Emily Rice & Jacopo Trifone
 Music Editor — Simon Changer
 Additional Music Editors — Ben Smithers & Arabella Winter
 Music Consultant — Bob Badami
 Score Orchestrations and Copyist — Jonathan Beard, Edward Trybek, Henri Wilkinson & Tom Holkenborg
 Librarian — Jill Streater
 Conductor — John Ashton Thomas
 Recording Engineer and Mixer — Nick Wollage
 Music Production Services — Michael Groeneveld

References

2018 soundtrack albums
Works based on Tomb Raider
Sony Classical Records soundtracks
Junkie XL albums
Action film soundtracks
Adventure film soundtracks